In quantum mechanics, the inverse square potential is a form of a central force potential which has the unusual property of the eigenstates of the corresponding Hamiltonian operator remaining eigenstates in a scaling of all cartesian coordinates by the same constant. Apart from this curious feature, it's by far less important central force problem than that of the Keplerian inverse square force system.

Description 

The potential energy function of an inverse square potential is

,

If  is positive, the potential is attractive and if  is negative, the potential is repulsive. The corresponding Hamiltonian operator  is

,

where  is the mass of the particle moving in the potential.

Properties 

The canonical commutation relation of quantum mechanics, has the property of being invariant in a scaling

, and
,

where  is some scaling factor. The momentum  and the position  are vectors, while the components , and the radius  are scalars.

Therefore, the energy spectrum of the system is a continuum of values.

The system with a particle in an inverse square potential with positive  (attractive potential) is an example of so-called falling-to-center problem, where there is no lowest energy wavefunction and there are eigenfunctions where the particle is arbitrarily localized in the vicinity of the central point .

See also 

 Canonical commutation relation
 Central force
 Scale invariance

References 

Quantum mechanics